The Western Regions or Xiyu (Hsi-yü) was a historical name specified in the Chinese chronicles between the 3rd century BC to the 8th century AD that referred to the regions west of Yumen Pass, most often Central Asia or sometimes more specifically the easternmost portion of it (e.g. Altishahr or the Tarim Basin in southern Xinjiang), though it was sometimes used more generally to refer to other regions to the west of China as well, such as the Indian subcontinent (as in the novel Journey to the West). The earliest Chinese political control of the region began in 60 BC, when China established a military and administrative office which was responsible for what would be present day Xinjiang and parts of Central Asia.

In 138 BC, the Han dynasty emperor Hanwu sent an envoy, Zhang Qian, to Xiyu in an effort to find allies to mitigate the threat posed by the Huns. Although Zhang was unsuccessful, his travels served as a precursor for the long history between China and Central Asia.

Because of its strategic location astride the Silk Road, the Western Regions have been historically significant to China since at least the 3rd century BC. It was the site of the Han–Xiongnu War until 89 AD. In the 7th century, the Tang campaign against the Western Regions led to Chinese control of the region until the An Lushan Rebellion.

The region became significant in later centuries as a cultural conduit between East Asia, the Indian subcontinent, the Muslim world and Europe, such as during the period of the Mongol Empire. One of the most significant exports of the Western Regions was Buddhist texts, particularly the Mahayana sutras, which were carried by traders and pilgrim monks to China. The Tang dynasty monk Xuanzang crossed the region on his way to study in India, resulting in the influential Great Tang Records on the Western Regions upon his return to the Tang capital of Chang'an.

Before the onset of Turkic migrations, the peoples of the region spoke two main groups of Indo-European languages. The peoples of oasis city-states of Hotan and Kashgar spoke Saka, one of the Eastern Iranian languages, whereas the people of Kucha, Turpan and Loulan Kingdom spoke the Tocharian languages.

Xiyu tudi renwu lüe (Brief Records of the Lands and Peoples in the Western Regions), a chapter in the Gazetteer of Shaanxi compiled by Chinese scholar Ma Li in 1542, documents a route leading from the Jiayu Pass, China's northwestern outpost, to the Ottoman capital Istanbul and geography and economy of the places along the route.

The control exercised over Xiyu by Chinese dynasties varied over time. In the 19th century, Russia annexed Central Asia. By the early twentieth century, Russia (and then its successor state the Soviet Union) controlled most of Xiyu.

See also 
Battle of Talas
Hexi Corridor
History of the Han dynasty
Kingdom of Khotan
Kingdom of Shule
Sogdia
Turkestan
Protectorate of the Western Regions
Protectorate General to Pacify the West
Ethnic groups in Chinese history

References

Citations

Sources 

 Yap, Joseph P. (2009). Wars with the Xiongnu - a translation from Zizhi Tongjian Chapters 4-17. AuthorHouse. .
 西域考古図譜 : vol.1 西域考古図譜 : vol.2

Further reading
 Yap, Joseph P, (2019). The Western Regions, Xiongnu and Han, from the Shiji, Hanshu and Hou Hanshu. .

Historical regions
Chinese Central Asia
History of Xinjiang
Han dynasty
Tang dynasty
Inner Asia